is a Super Famicom title that revolves around tarot divination and answering questions in Japanese. This video game would become Yasuaki Fujita's final project as a composer for Super Famicom video games.

Features

The title is considered to be a simulation of a Tarot reading. The title was not released in North America or Europe. Users ask questions and look at cards. The cards used in the game are from the classic Rider–Waite deck, illustrated by Pamela Colman Smith. 

Each reading consists of a Celtic cross where 12 cards are picked by the person being read. These cards will tell about the player's past, present, and future via on-screen text. The game automatically reads the person's fortune. Once the cards are dealt, each card deals with different issues in the player's future. They are: current situation, issues, awareness, subconscious, past problems, future, present position, environment, hope, and result.

Reception
On release, Famicom Tsūshin scored the Neo Geo version of the game a 20 out of 40.

See also 
 House of Tarot  1991 Sega video game
 Taboo: The Sixth Sense 1989 Nintendo video game

References

External links
 Super-Famicom (Japanese)

1995 video games
Japan-exclusive video games
Super Nintendo Entertainment System games
Super Nintendo Entertainment System-only games
Tarotology
Ukiyotei games
Video games developed in Japan
Video games scored by Yasuaki Fujita
Divination software and games